Dimitrios Gus Polizos (August 14, 1950 – March 27, 2019) was an American politician. He was a member of the Alabama House of Representatives from the 74th District, serving from November 2013 until his death. He served on the Montgomery County commission and was a member of the Republican party.

Polizos went to Troy University. He was the owner of a restaurant in Montgomery. Polizos died following a heart attack in 2019, while still in office.

References

1950 births
2019 deaths
County commissioners in Alabama
Republican Party members of the Alabama House of Representatives
Politicians from Montgomery, Alabama
Businesspeople from Alabama
Troy University alumni
21st-century American politicians
20th-century American businesspeople